Arnold Reymond (1874–1958) was a Swiss theolgian, philosopher (logician) and historian of science.

Life

Reymond received a doctorate from the University of Geneva in 1908; his thesis on the history of ideas of the infinite, Logique et mathématiques, was reviewed by Bertrand Russell in Mind. Reymond taught at the University of Neuchâtel from 1912 to 1925, where he taught and influenced Jean Piaget. In 1925 he took up a chair at the University of Lausanne.

Works
Logique et mathématiques: essai historique et critique sur le nombre infini, Saint-Blaise: Foyer Solidariste, 1908
Histoire des sciences exactes et naturelles dans l'Antiquité gréco-romaine, Paris: 1924. Translated as History of the sciences in Greco-Roman antiquity, New York: E. P. Dutton & Co., 1927
Les penseurs de la Grèce; histoire de la philosophie antique, 1928
Les principes de la logique et la critique contemporaine, 1932
Philosophie spiritualiste; études et méditations, recherches critiques, 1942
L'Histoire des sciences et la philosophie des sciences, 1949

References

1874 births
1958 deaths
Philosophers of science
Historians of science
Swiss philosophers
Swiss Protestants
University of Geneva alumni
Academic staff of the University of Lausanne
Academic staff of the University of Neuchâtel